Madhuram Thirumadhuram is a 1976 Indian Malayalam film, directed by Dr. Balakrishnan and produced by Ammini Madhavan. The film stars KPAC Lalitha, Sankaradi, Raghavan, Rani Chandra, Soman, Vincent, Jayan and Unnimary in the lead roles. The film has musical score by A. T. Ummer.

Plot
Radha (Rani Chandra) falls for the playboy Rajan (Vincent) who treats her shamefully. Jayan plays Babu one of Rajan's spendthrift friends who encourages all his bad habits. Radha's brothers Bhaskaran (M.G. Soman) and Vijayan (Raghavan) decide to take a hand in her affairs. After Rajan loses all his money, his friends forsake him and he and his sister have to take employment at Radha's house.

Cast

M. G. Soman as Bhaskaran
Raghavan as Vijayan
Jayan as Babu
Unnimary as Malini
Vincent as Rajan 
Rani Chandra as Radha
Kuthiravattam Pappu as Naanu
Sadhana as Vimala
Sankaradi as Nair
KPAC Lalitha as Pathumma
Pattom Sadan as Vasu
Mala Aravindan as Vakkeel
Cochin Haneefa as Benny
Lalithasree as Naani
Paravoor Bharathan as Hotelier

Soundtrack
The music was composed by A. T. Ummer and the lyrics were written by Dr. Balakrishnan, Ravi Vallathol and Muppathu Ramachandran.

References

External links
 

1976 films
1970s Malayalam-language films